Hodgson Vale is a rural locality in the Toowoomba Region, Queensland, Australia.

Geography 
The highway passes through the locality from the north (Top Camp) to the west (Vale View/Cambooya).

Hodgson Creek rises just to the north (Top Camp) and flows through the locality to the south-west (Cambooya). It eventually becomes a tributary of the Condamine River (part of the Murray-Darling basin) at North Branch.

History 

The locality is believed to be named for Sir Arthur Hodgson, a pioneer and member for the Legislative Assembly seat of Warrego in 1868–1869. In July 1840 he selected the Eton Vale pastoral run (the second pastoral run selected in present-day Queensland). The Eton Vale homestead was beside Hodgson Creek in the present day locality of Cambooya.

Hodgsons Vale Provisional School opened on 14 June 1906. It became Hodgsons Vale State School on 1 January 1909. It closed in 1960.

Education 
There are no schools in Hodgson Vale, but there are primary schools in neighbouring Vale View and Ramsay. The nearest secondary schools are in the Toowoomba suburbs of Centenary Heights (Centenary Heights State High School) and Harristown (Harristown State High School).

References

Further reading 

 

Suburbs of Toowoomba
Localities in Queensland